Bang Jun-yeong (born 10 October 1965) is a South Korean butterfly swimmer. He competed in two events at the 1984 Summer Olympics. He attended Sungkyunkwan University.

References

External links
 

1965 births
Living people
South Korean male butterfly swimmers
Olympic swimmers of South Korea
Swimmers at the 1984 Summer Olympics
Place of birth missing (living people)
Sungkyunkwan University alumni
Asian Games medalists in swimming
Asian Games silver medalists for South Korea
Swimmers at the 1982 Asian Games
Medalists at the 1982 Asian Games
20th-century South Korean people